Cookeina tricholoma, also known by its common name bristly tropical cup, is a species of fungus from the genus Cookeina.

References

Sarcoscyphaceae
Taxa named by Camille Montagne
Fungi described in 1834